Hollywood is an unincorporated community located near U.S. Route 61 in Tunica County, Mississippi, United States.

History
Hollywood was located along the now-abandoned Illinois Central Gulf Railroad.  The population in 1900 was 291.

References

Unincorporated communities in Tunica County, Mississippi
Unincorporated communities in Mississippi
Memphis metropolitan area